Schistophoron is a genus of lichenized fungi in the family Graphidaceae. It contains 5 species.

References

Graphidaceae
Lichen genera
Ostropales genera
Taxa named by James Stirton